Sieg im Westen (Victory in the West) is a 1941 Nazi propaganda film.

It was produced by the Oberkommando des Heeres, the German Army High Command, rather than the Propaganda Ministry of Joseph Goebbels.  Goebbels indeed sabotaged its release in minor ways, delaying its premiere and telling propagandists not to promote it. Erwin Rommel has been described as enthusiastically helping to direct it. French prisoners of war were used during its making.

The prologue consists of the Nazi version of European history and the origins of World War II, and the rest deals with the Battle of France, a Blitzkrieg in the Low Countries and France (10 May – 22 June 1940).  The movie was made largely from newsreel footage recut into a documentary.  The programme provided states that it is to show the audacity of the German offensive and the superiority of German arms, required because they will not be permitted to live in peace.  It did not give Hitler or the Nazi party a central role, thus ensuring its disfavor with Goebbels.

The Nazi journal "Der deutsche Film" called  Sieg im Westen "the greatest of all German newsreels."  Unlike many other German propaganda films, Sieg im Westen does not belittle the enemy, instead admitting that the French soldiers fought gallantly.

The war is presented "from above"; the battles are depicted as smooth forward advances on the map, with results from reports at the front.  The "encirclement" of Germany is depicted by showing prisoners of war from far-off countries.

During the shooting of the movie Black French soldiers who were prisoners of war were forced to take part in its making, at the end of the movie Germans forced them to carry out "exotic dance", most likely to underline their exotic "otherness" and as act of humiliation.

On 14 August 1940, more than a dozen German Generals who had (three weeks ago) been appointed Field Marshal after the successful Westfeldzug were in Berlin to be presented with their ceremonial batons. While in Berlin, they were shown 'Sieg im Westen'.

See also 
List of German films 1933–1945
Wochenschau (English: The German Weekly Review)

References

Further reading
Hoffman, Hilmar.  The Triumph of Propaganda: Film and National Socialism, 1933-45.

External links
 
Information at International Historic Films
Picture of a program
Free access to the film at the Internet Archive

1941 films
1941 documentary films
Black-and-white documentary films
German documentary films
Films of Nazi Germany
Nazi World War II propaganda films
German black-and-white films
1940s German-language films